The New Zealand Professional Firefighters Union (NZPFU) is a trade union providing professional advocacy and support for career firefighters, trainers, volunteer support officers, fire risk management officers, and fire and emergency dispatchers employed by Fire and Emergency New Zealand.

The NZPFU is affiliated with the New Zealand Council of Trade Unions as well as the International Association of Fire Fighters.

As well as the key role played by the NZPFU in the organisation of a 1995 referendum on firefighter numbers in response to an industrial dispute, the NZPFU continues to work towards the betterment of working conditions for all of its members.

References

External links
 

New Zealand Council of Trade Unions
Firefighters associations
Firefighting in New Zealand